Kensington Road is a main road in the South Australian capital city of Adelaide, linking the Adelaide city centre to its eastern suburbs.

Route
Its western end, on the edge of the Adelaide city centre, starts at the Britannia Roundabout on the City Ring Route. Kensington Road continues east through Adelaide's eastern suburbs of Leabrook and Erindale, before the road dead-ends at the foot of the western Adelaide Hills in Wattle Park.

History
Kensington Road has also been subject to controversial development by the Shahin family for their OTR headquarters, with over five attempts of approval despite community opposition.

Major intersections

References 

City of Burnside
Roads in Adelaide